For information on exports, see Export. For Harmonized Codes, see Harmonized System.

The following is a list of export product categories that were exported the most and fetched foreign currency for India. The list includes the HS Codes and the value of the product exported. The data referenced in the system do not have any legal sanctity and is for general reference only.

List of exports 2017
The following is the list of top 30 export product categories. Data is in millions of United States dollars for 2017, as reported by Department of Commerce, Government of India.

List of exports 2016
The following is the list of top twenty export product categories. Data is for 2016, in millions of United States dollars, as reported by Department of Commerce, Government of India.

List of exports 2015
The following is the list of top twenty export product categories. Data is for 2015, in millions of United States dollars, as reported by Department of Commerce, Government of India.

List of exports 2014
The following is the list of top twenty export product categories. Data is for 2014, in millions of United States dollars, as reported by Department of Commerce, Government of India.

List of exports 2013
The following is the list of top twenty export product categories. Data is for 2013, in millions of United States dollars, as reported by Department of Commerce, Government of India.

List of exports 2012

The following is a list of the exports of India. Data is for 2012, in millions of United States dollars, as reported by The Observatory of Economic Complexity. Currently the top twenty exports are listed.

See also
 Economy of India
 Remittances to India 
 Business process outsourcing to India
 Foreign trade of India
 Largest trading partners of India
 Indian diaspora
 Indianisation

References
 
 
 atlas.media.mit.edu – Observatory of Economic complexity – Products exported by India (2012)

Foreign trade of India
India
Exports